A blackboard (also known as a chalkboard) is a reusable writing surface on which text or drawings are made with sticks of calcium sulphate or calcium carbonate, known, when used for this purpose, as chalk. Blackboards were originally made of smooth, thin sheets of black or dark grey slate stone.

Design

A blackboard can simply be a board painted with a dark matte paint (usually black, occasionally dark green). Matte black plastic sign material (known as closed-cell PVC foamboard) is also used to create custom chalkboard art. Blackboards on an A-frame are used by restaurants and bars to advertise daily specials.

A more modern variation consists of a coiled sheet of plastic drawn across two parallel rollers, which can be scrolled to create additional writing space while saving what has been written. The highest grade blackboards are made of a rougher version porcelain enamelled steel (black, green, blue or sometimes other colours). Porcelain is very hard wearing, and blackboards made of porcelain usually last 10–20 years in intensive use.

Lecture theatres may contain a number of blackboards in a grid arrangement. The lecturer then moves boards into reach for writing and then moves them out of reach, allowing a large amount of material to be shown simultaneously.

The chalk marks can be easily wiped off with a damp cloth, a sponge or a special blackboard eraser usually consisting of a block of wood covered by a felt pad. However, chalk marks made on some types of wet blackboard can be difficult to remove. Blackboard manufacturers often advise that a new or newly resurfaced blackboard be completely covered using the side of a stick of chalk and then that chalk brushed off as normal to prepare it for use.

Chalk sticks

Sticks of processed "chalk" are produced especially for use with blackboards in white and also in various colours.  White chalk sticks are made mainly from calcium carbonate derived from mineral chalk rock or limestone, while coloured or pastel chalks are made from calcium sulphate in its dihydrate form, CaSO4·2H2O, derived from gypsum. Chalk sticks containing calcium carbonate typically contain 40–60% of CaCO3 (calcite).

Advantages and disadvantages

As compared to whiteboards, blackboards still have a variety of advantages:

Chalk requires no special care; whiteboard markers must be capped or else they will dry out.
Chalk is an order of magnitude cheaper than whiteboard markers for a comparable amount of writing.
It is easier to draw lines of different weights and thicknesses with chalk than with whiteboard markers.
Dashed lines can be drawn very quickly using a technique involving the friction of the chalk (or chalk marker) and blackboard.
Chalk has a mild smell, whereas whiteboard markers often have a pungent odour.
Chalk writing often provides better contrast than whiteboard markers.
Chalk can be easily erased; writing which has been left on a whiteboard for a prolonged period may require a solvent to remove.
Chalk can be easily removed from most clothing; whiteboard markers often permanently stain fabric, wood (wood frame), etc.
Chalk is mostly biodegradable, whereas most plastic recyclers will not take whiteboard markers.

On the other hand, chalk produces dust, the amount depending on the quality of chalk used.  Some people find this uncomfortable or may be allergic to it, and according to the American Academy of Allergy, Asthma and Immunology (AAAAI), there are links between chalk dust and allergy and asthma problems. The dust also precludes the use of chalk in areas shared with dust-sensitive equipment such as computers. The writing on blackboards is difficult to read in the dark. Chalk sticks shrink through use, and are notorious for breaking in half unless inserted in a writing utensil designed for chalk. Blackboards can suffer from ghosting. Ghosting occurs when old coloured chalk, pastels or chalkpen ink absorbs into the black finish of the board, making it impossible to remove.

The scratching of fingernails on a blackboard, as well as other pointed, especially metal objects against blackboards, produces a sound that is well known for being extremely irritating to most people. According to a study run by Michael Oehler, a professor at the University of Cologne, Germany, humans are "predisposed to detest" the sound of nails on a blackboard. The findings of the study were presented at the Acoustical Society of America conference and support earlier findings from a 1986 study by Vanderbilt psychologist Randolph Blake and two colleagues found that the sound of nails on a chalkboard annoyed people even when the high-pitch frequencies were removed. The study earned Blake a 2006 Ig Nobel Prize.

Etymology and history

The writing slate was in use in Indian schools as mentioned in Alberuni's Indica (Tarikh Al-Hind), written in the early 11th century:

They use black tablets for the children in the schools, and write upon them along the long side, not the broadside, writing with a white material from the left to the right.

The first classroom uses of large blackboards are difficult to date, but they were used for music education and composition in Europe as far back as the 16th century. The term "blackboard" is attested in English from the mid-18th century; the Oxford English Dictionary provides a citation from 1739, to write "with Chalk on a black-Board". The first attested use of chalk on blackboard in the United States dates to September 21, 1801, in a lecture course in mathematics given by George Baron. James Pillans has been credited with the invention of coloured chalk (1814); he had a recipe with ground chalk, dyes and porridge.

The use of blackboard did change methods of education and testing, as found in the Conic Sections Rebellion of 1830 in Yale.
Manufacturing of slate blackboards began by the 1840s. Green porcelain enamel surface, was first used in 1930, and as this type of boards became popular, the word "chalkboard" appeared. In the US green porcelain enamelled boards started to appear at schools in 1950s.

Gallery

See also

 Blackboard bold
 Blackboard Jungle
 Chalkboard font
 Chalkboard gag from The Simpsons
 Chalkzone
 Conic Sections Rebellion, an 1830 student uprising when Yale students were required to draw their own diagrams on the blackboard
 Hagoromo Bungu, Japanese chalk company
 Sidewalk chalk
 Simon in the Land of Chalk Drawings
 Slate
 Tacita Dean, an artist who often uses blackboards in her work

Notes

Further reading

External links 
 
 
 

Office equipment
Educational devices
School terminology
Writing media